Conor Patrick Casey (born July 25, 1981) is an American former soccer player. He played for 16 seasons, finishing his career with Columbus Crew SC, before turning to coaching with his former club Colorado Rapids.

Playing career

Youth and college
Casey was born in New Hampshire, but moved to Colorado at age five, and considers Denver his hometown. He played soccer at Denver's South High School and went on to play two years of college soccer for the University of Portland from 1999 to 2000. In his first year at the University of Portland, Casey was named best player of the year. In 2000, he led the NCAA in scoring with twenty-three goals and seven assists.

Professional
After playing well in the 2000 Summer Olympics Casey signed a four-year contract with German club Borussia Dortmund. After finishing a year of playing with the club, Casey was loaned out in the 2001–02 season to Hannover 96, where he scored seven goals in nineteen games. The subsequent year, Casey stayed with Dortmund, but only saw action in four games, scoring one goal. In 2003–04, he was again loaned to a second division club, Karlsruher SC, scoring fourteen goals in thirty games. In 2004, Casey signed with Bundesliga club Mainz 05, but scored only two goals and struggled with injuries during two-and-a-half seasons with the club.

After being released by Mainz, Casey returned to America and signed with Major League Soccer. Casey was originally allocated to Toronto FC and after 2 games with 0 goals and 0 assists, he was traded to his hometown club, Colorado Rapids, on April 19, 2007, in exchange for Riley O'Neill and an undisclosed amount of allocation money.

He played 15 games with the Rapids in 2007, scoring 2 goals and 3 assists. In 2008, he scored 11 goals and 2 assists in 21 games. Casey ended the 2009 MLS season, with 16 goals, just one less than leader Jeff Cunningham to go along with 1 assist in 24 games. He was named in the MLS Best XI in 2009. In 2010, Casey became the All Time goal scorer for the Colorado Rapids as he scored 13 goals and 6 assists in 27 games. Likewise in 2010, Casey was selected as the MVP for the 2010 MLS Cup championship though the representative of the award sponsor announced "Casey Conor" when awarding it. In 2011, Casey suffered a season-ending Achilles tendon injury  in a July 16 game against the Seattle Sounders FC as he finished that season with 6 goals and 1 assist in 14 games. In 2012, Casey scored 2 goals and 3 assists in 18 games. On November 16, 2012, Casey was released by the Colorado Rapids.

On December 14, 2012, Casey was selected by Philadelphia Union in the first round of the 2012 MLS Re-Entry Draft, Stage 2. On January 23, 2015, it was announced that Casey had signed a new contract with the club for the 2015 season.

After three seasons in Philadelphia, Casey signed with Columbus Crew SC on January 26, 2016.

International
Casey played at the 2001 World Youth Championship in Argentina and then graduated to the senior United States national team, getting his first cap on March 31, 2004, against Poland. On July 7, 2005, Casey suffered a tear to his ACL while playing against Cuba in the U.S.'s opening game of the Gold Cup. He served as a late sub for the United States during several matches in the 2009 Confederations Cup. Casey scored twice (his first ever Senior team goals) against Honduras in a critical world cup qualifier at San Pedro Sula, Honduras, on October 10, 2009. The unanimous Man of the Match, Casey scored the U.S.'s first two goals, and was fouled to set up the game-winning free-kick goal by Landon Donovan. The win put the United States through to the 2010 World Cup.

Managerial career
On January 26, 2017, Casey was hired by Colorado Rapids as an assistant coach. On May 1, 2019, head coach Anthony Hudson was fired and Casey was promoted to interim head coach.

In December 2021, Casey was announced as the new head coach of the Charleston Battery in the USL Championship, becoming the sixth head coach in the club's history. Charleston and Casey mutually agreed to part ways on October 12, 2022.

Career statistics

Club
Sources:

International
Source:

Managerial

Honors
Colorado Rapids
 Major League Soccer Eastern Conference Championship: 2010
 Major League Soccer MLS Cup: 2010

United States
 CONCACAF Gold Cup Champions: 2005

Individual
 MLS Cup Most Valuable Player: 2010
 MLS Best XI: 2009
 Colorado Rapids – All Time Goal Scorer: 54
 Colorado Rapids – All Time Hat Trick: 3

References

External links
 
 
 

Living people
1981 births
American soccer players
American soccer coaches
Soccer players from New Hampshire
People from Dover, New Hampshire
Sportspeople from Strafford County, New Hampshire
Association football forwards
University of Portland alumni
Portland Pilots men's soccer players
Borussia Dortmund II players
Borussia Dortmund players
Hannover 96 players
Karlsruher SC players
1. FSV Mainz 05 players
1. FSV Mainz 05 II players
Toronto FC players
Colorado Rapids players
Philadelphia Union players
Columbus Crew players
Regionalliga players
Oberliga (football) players
Bundesliga players
2. Bundesliga players
Major League Soccer players
United States men's under-20 international soccer players
United States men's under-23 international soccer players
Olympic soccer players of the United States
United States men's international soccer players
Footballers at the 2000 Summer Olympics
2005 CONCACAF Gold Cup players
2009 FIFA Confederations Cup players
Major League Soccer All-Stars
CONCACAF Gold Cup-winning players
American expatriate soccer players
American expatriate soccer players in Germany
Expatriate soccer players in Canada
American expatriate sportspeople in Canada
Colorado Rapids non-playing staff
Colorado Rapids coaches
Major League Soccer coaches
Charleston Battery coaches
Pan American Games bronze medalists for the United States
Footballers at the 1999 Pan American Games
Medalists at the 1999 Pan American Games
Pan American Games medalists in football